The Bleak Old Shop of Stuff is a four-part comedy series produced by BBC, which premiered on BBC Two on 19 December 2011. It is a parody of the works of Charles Dickens, drawing its title from Bleak House and The Old Curiosity Shop. It is a television successor to Bleak Expectations, a radio parody of Dickens which began in 2007, and with which it shares the writer Mark Evans, producer Gareth Edwards and actor Richard Johnson; while not a direct adaptation it shares the same style, atmosphere and sense of humour. It is directed by Ben Gosling Fuller, who also directed the show That Mitchell and Webb Look.

The main characters are played by Robert Webb and Katherine Parkinson with cameos and guest appearances from celebrities including Stephen Fry, David Mitchell, Phyllida Law, Johnny Vegas and Adrian Edmondson. Some of the cast from Bleak Expectations including Sarah Hadland, Richard Johnson, Susy Kane and Tom Allen also appear.

The series was commissioned to coincide with the bicentenary of Charles Dickens' birth. The last episode aired on 5 March 2012.

Synopsis
The plot is set in Victorian London and revolves around Jedrington Secret-Past (Robert Webb) and his family: his wife Conceptiva (Katherine Parkinson), son Victor (Finlay Christie) and daughter Victoria (Ambra Lily Keegan).

The characters and themes are based on some of Dickens' most famous novels, including Great Expectations, David Copperfield, Oliver Twist and A Christmas Carol. Some themes of the time were referenced from time to time including the anti-French sentiment, harsh corporal punishments used in schools, debtors' prisons, filthy living conditions in London and the large gap between rich and poor.

Main characters
Jedrington Secret-Past - the main protagonist, long-lost son of Miss Christmasham. He is an up-standing family man and owner of The Old Shop of Stuff, Victorian London's most successful purveyor of miscellaneous odd things. Portrayed by Robert Webb
Conceptiva Secret-Past - wife to Jedrington. Portrayed by Katherine Parkinson
Victor Secret-Past - son of Jedrington and Conceptiva. Portrayed by Finlay Christie
Victoria Secret-Past - daughter of Jedrington and Conceptiva. Portrayed by Ambra Lily Keegan

Other cast members
Christmas Special
Stephen Fry as evil lawyer Malifax Skulkingworm, a parody of Mr. Tulkinghorn from Bleak House
Joshua McGuire as Fearshiver, Skulkingworm's clerk, a parody of Daniel Quilp from The Old Curiosity Shop
Terrence Hardiman as Martin Christmasham, a man who went mad after having a dead goose thrown on his head by a young Malifax Skulkingworm (giving him the nickname of Martin Fruitcake whilst in 'The Skint') and failing to marry his fiancée - Miss Christmasham. Their son was Jedrington Secret-Past, and they were eventually married at the end of the first episode. A parody of Martin Chuzzlewit from the novel of the same name.  'The Skint' refers to The Clink Prison.
Celia Imrie as Miss Christmasham, the long-lost biological mother of Jedrington, eventual wife to Martin Christmasham, and former lover of Skulkingworm. A parody of Miss Havisham from Great Expectations
Judy Parfitt as Aunt Chastity
Phyllida Law as Aunt Sobriety
Una Stubbs as Aunt Good Spelling
Richard Johnson as Uncle Writes Prompt Thank You Cards
Johnny Vegas as The Artful Codger, an older urchin who failed his exam to pass for ne'er-do-well or vagabond. A parody of The Artful Dodger from Oliver Twist
Sidney Johnston as Urchin
Pauline McLynn as Maggoty, a 'treacle fiend' whom the Secret-Pasts meet in The Skint debtor's prison and has a habit of affectionately calling people birds' names, e.g. "my little songthrush".  A parody of Miss Flite from Bleak House, though the name refers to Peggoty from David Copperfield.

Episode 1
Susy Kane as the Duchess of Money

Episodes 1-2
Adrian Edmondson as the evil Dr Wackville, headmaster of St Nasty's

Episodes 1-3
Tim McInnerny as Harmswell Grimstone
Derek Griffiths as Pusweasel, Harmswell's assistant
Kevin Eldon as Servegood, Jedrington's assistant
Blake Harrison as Smalcolm, pupil and friend of Victor's at St Nasty's
Sarah Hadland as governess Miss Primly Tightclench

Episode 2
Tom Allen as a Gentleman of a Cockney Persuasion

Episodes 2-3
Llewella Gideon as Mrs Grumblechoop, a poor woman who saves and then attempts to exploit Conceptiva

Christmas special & Episode 2
David Mitchell as Jolliforth Jollington, a man who swells to a large size when thinking about happy things, and who deflates upon thinking depressing things or by being hurt (e.g. being mildly punched). Loosely based on Wilkins Micawber from David Copperfield.

Episode 3
Graeme Garden as Judge Harshmore Grimstone, Harmswell's uncle

Cameos
Mark Evans as vicar of St Christmas (Christmas special), businessman (episode 1), peasant (episode 2)
Abigail Burdess as Skulkingworm's mother in flashback (Christmas special), Mary-Anne (episode 1), unnamed woman in Jedrington's "dream" (episode 2)
Dave Lamb as the Ghost of the Christmas Past from A Christmas Carol (Christmas special), Neverlost Dunthem (episode 3)
Fergus Craig as poor person (episodes 1 & 2)

Episodes

References

External links 
 
 
 
 

2011 British television series debuts
2012 British television series endings
2010s British comedy television series
Television shows based on works by Charles Dickens
British parody television series
BBC high definition shows
BBC television comedy
English-language television shows